Joe & Valerie is an American sitcom starring Paul Regina and Char Fontane as the title characters that aired on NBC in two parts: four half-hour segments from April 24 to May 10, 1978, and three half-hour segments from January 5 to January 19, 1979 (with one episode remaining unaired). The series was produced by Bob Hope's production company, Hope Enterprises, and his daughter, Linda, served as executive producer.

Synopsis and changing formats
The first season, set in 1978 Brooklyn, follows the romantic misadventures of a teenage couple – Joe Pizo, an apprentice plumber, and Valerie Sweetzer, a cosmetics salesgirl – who meet and fall in love at a New York City disco. Joe shares an apartment with his roommates Frank and Paulie (who call themselves "The Big Three") while Valerie lives at home with her divorced mother, Stella.

The second season in early 1979 centers on the courtship, marriage and efforts of Joe and Valerie as they begin a married life together in Brooklyn. This new updated version of the series also saw cast changes as the role of Valerie's mother Stella was recast with Arlene Golonka and Lloyd Alan replaced Bill Beyers as Joe's chauvinist friend Frank; Donna Ponterotto returned as Valerie's friend, but her character name was changed from Thelma to Rita.

The show was highly influenced by the disco craze of the late 1970s and the movie Saturday Night Fever specifically.

Cast

Season 1
Paul Regina as Joe Pizo (Valerie's boyfriend, an apprentice plumber)
Char Fontane as Valerie Sweetzer (Joe's girlfriend, a cosmetics salesgirl)
Bill Beyers as Frank Berganski (Joe's friend/roommate, a chauvinist)
David Elliott as Paulie Barone (Joe's friend/roommate, a hearse driver)
Donna Ponterotto as Thelma Medina (Valerie's friend)
Pat Benson as Stella Sweetzer (Valerie's mother)
Robert Costanzo as Vincent Pizo (Joe's father, a plumber)

Season 2
Paul Regina as Joe Pizo (Valerie's husband, an apprentice plumber)
Char Fontane as Valerie Sweetzer-Pizo (Joe's wife, a cosmetics salesgirl)
Lloyd Alan as Frank Berganski (Joe's friend, a chauvinist)
David Elliott as Paulie Barone (Joe's friend, a hearse driver)
Donna Ponterotto as Rita (Valerie's friend)
Arlene Golonka as Stella Sweetzer (Valerie's mother)
Robert Costanzo as Vincent Pizo (Joe's father, a plumber)
Jack Riley as Ed Sweetzer (Valerie's father, Stella's ex-husband)

Episodes

Season 1 (1978)

Season 2 (1979)

References

External links 
 

1970s American sitcoms
1978 American television series debuts
1979 American television series endings
Brooklyn in fiction
English-language television shows
Fictional married couples
NBC original programming
Television duos
Television series about couples
Television series about teenagers
Television shows set in New York City